Atasthalistis ochreoviridella is a moth in the family Gelechiidae. It was described by Pagenstecher in 1900. It is found in Queensland, the Bismarck Archipelago, the Philippines (Mindanao), New Guinea and the Dampier Archipelago.

The wingspan is about 20 mm. The forewings are grey-brown (with a greenish tinge in males) with a large dark mark with a pale outline on the costa. The hindwings are orange with a broad dark margin.

The larvae feed on Macaranga species.

References

Moths described in 1900
Dichomeridinae
Moths of Asia
Moths of Oceania